= Federal banking =

Federal banking is the term for the way the Federal Reserve of the United States distributes its money. The Reserve (often called with the abbreviation "Fed") operates twelve banking districts around the country which oversee money distribution within their respective districts. The twelve cities which are home to the Reserve Banks are Boston, New York City, Philadelphia, Richmond, Atlanta, Dallas, Saint Louis, Cleveland, Chicago, Minneapolis, Kansas City, and San Francisco.

== See also ==
- Federal Reserve
